Spark New Zealand Limited is a New Zealand telecommunications and digital services company providing fixed-line telephone services, mobile phone services, broadband, and digital technology services including cloud, security, digital transformation and managed services. Its customers range from consumers to small - medium business, government agencies and large enterprise clients. It was formerly known as Telecom New Zealand until it was rebranded to Spark in 2014. It has operated as a publicly traded company since 1990. Spark's mobile network reaches 98% of New Zealand, with over 2.5 million mobile connections and 704,000 broadband connections

Spark is one of the largest companies by value on the New Zealand Exchange (NZX). As of 2007, it was the 39th largest telecommunications company in the OECD. The company is part of New Zealand Telecommunications Forum.

Telecom New Zealand was formed in 1987 from a division of the New Zealand Post Office, and privatised in 1990. In 2008, Telecom was operationally separated into three divisions under local loop unbundling initiatives by central government – Telecom Retail; Telecom Wholesale; and Chorus, the network infrastructure division. This separation effectively ended any remnants of monopoly that Telecom Retail once had in the market. In 2011 the demerger process was complete, with Telecom and Chorus becoming separate listed companies. The company changed its name to Spark New Zealand on 8 August 2014.

Spark has 63 retail locations around New Zealand, including 16 in Auckland.

History
The Postal Services Act 1987 split the then New Zealand Post Office into New Zealand Post Limited (trading as NZPost), Telecom Corporation of New Zealand Limited (trading as Telecom) and Post Office Bank Limited (trading as PostBank, sold to ANZ in 1989) and all three industries progressively deregulated. The selling price of Telecom was considered by some to be extremely low, given that Telecom had a monopoly of all phone lines in New Zealand at the time.

1990s
In 1990, Telecom was sold to two United States-based telecommunications companies, Verizon Communications (formerly Bell Atlantic) and Ameritech, for NZ$4.25 billion. After Telecom was privatized, the Kiwi Share agreement was drawn up, which included a provision that the company retained free local calling for residential customers.

In 1991, Telecom listed on the New Zealand, Australian and New York stock exchanges. The following year Telecom implemented a NZ$200 million fibre-optic cable connection between Australia and New Zealand. Also in 1991, Roderick Deane was appointed CEO of the company. Then in 1993 Ameritech and Bell Atlantic reduced their share in Telecom to a combined 49.6% and BellSouth New Zealand Limited (BellSouth), subsequently acquired by Vodafone, set up the first mobile network to compete with Telecom.

Clear Communications reached an agreement with Telecom in 1995 on local service interconnection. Also in 1995, Telecom created First Media Ltd to develop a cable television network across Auckland and Wellington, called First TV. In 1996 Telecom established a telephone exchange in the United States for international traffic, and launched Xtra, which is New Zealand's largest internet service provider today.

1997 saw Telecom buy back NZ$1 billion of its shares. The following year, Ameritech sold down its 24.8% shareholding in an international public offering, and Bell Atlantic issued exchangeable notes that were convertible into the Telecom shares that it owned. Also in 1998, Southern Cross Cables Limited (half owned by Telecom) announced plans to build a fibre-optic cable linking New Zealand with Australia and North America, and Vodafone New Zealand bought BellSouth and started a campaign to attract Telecom customers to its network.

In December 1997 Patricia Reddy was appointed to the Telecom board. She remained on it until 2008. In September 2016 as Dame Patsy Reddy she became the Governor General of New Zealand.

In 1999, Telecom established a presence in Australia, buying 78% of AAPT, Australia's third-largest telecommunications company. Telecom upgraded its nationwide payphone network to smart card technology. Telecom's broadband Internet service based on ADSL technology, called JetStream, was launched and rolled-out progressively in local exchanges. Also at this time, Telecom began charging customers who connected to the Internet using a local dial up number, forcing all ISPs in New Zealand to change to an 0867 dial up number. This resulted in complaints that this was in breach of Telecom's Kiwishare Agreement where residential customers are allowed free local calling. The decade was rounded off with Theresa Gattung being appointed new CEO of Telecom, with Rod Deane moving to the position of chairman.

2000s

In 2000, Xtra signed up its 300,000th customer. Telecom also raised its shareholding in AAPT to 100%.

Evidence emerged in early 2002 of Telecom having exploited an ill-considered, or fraudulently made to order, accounting standard (FRS38) to inflate its year 2001 reported profit by some $263 million. This standard required holding companies to incorporate profits and losses of associate companies into their group accounts by way of "equity accounting" except when the associate is insolvent. Being insolvent has been wrongly taken as substantial evidence that the holding company will no longer share in the associates profits and losses. The associate company Southern Cross Cables paid Telecom $263 million in dividends as per (note 2 of) Telecom's 2001 annual accounts, $US200m as per Southern Cross's annual accounts. Southern Cross opened for (limited) business in November 2000 and its income from operations to 30 June 2001 was only $US13 million ($US55 million for the 2002 year). Southern Cross were insolvent to the extent of $US24 million as at 30 June 2000 and this increased to $US280 million as at June 2001 as a result of the dividends and other (net) expenses ($328 million in 2002). The dividends were treated as income in Telecom's accounts there being nothing in FRS 28 to say that they should not be although such inclusion did breach an overall requirement that the accounts present a fair view.

In 2003, a new logo was launched.

In 2004, Telecom purchased Gen-i Ltd (in May) and Computerland Ltd (in September). The company had 36 retail stores around the country. During the year, the company won the Roger Award for The Worst Transnational Corporation operating in New Zealand.

In 2005, Telecom introduced "Bitstream", a 256 kbit ADSL service sold at wholesale prices (at approximately 10% below the retail price) to other ISPs. Telecom also posted a profit of NZ$916 million. The company also launched online retail store Ferrit launches with about 150 retailers.

2006
 9 May: An audio clip recorded on 2 March was released involving Telecom CEO Theresa Gattung admitting the use of confusion as a chief marketing tool in the industry. The March recording also dismissed the New Zealand Government as "too smart to do anything dumb" with regards to regulation.
 Late May: Roderick Deane resigns as chairman, and is replaced by Wayne Boyd the following month.
 July: Matt Crockett is appointed CEO of Telecom's newly formed Wholesale division.
 All Computerland branches around New Zealand are rebranded as Gen-i.

2007
 16 January: The Librarians Association of New Zealand put in a complaint about a Telecom advertisement where 3 young school children state that, "Only dumb kids read books, brainy kids have broadband." Originally Telecom stated that is the views of the young children and not Telecom and the advertisement was unscripted, later that week Telecom choose to edit the advertisement to remove the comments made by the children.
 19 January: It is reported that Paritai Drive, Ōrākei, one of the richest streets in Auckland, is still not capable of receiving a broadband SL service and there are many other well populated areas around New Zealand still not capable of receiving broadband. Opposition Woosh Wireless immediately tested their service in the area and gave residents the opportunity to join their wireless broadband service.
 5 February: Telecom announces that from March 2007 they will begin rolling out ADSL2+, more than a year after originally stated for roll out.
31 March: Telecom shuts down its old 025 D-AMPS/TDMA network with all 025 phones changed to 027 (CDMA).
May 2007: British Telecom have been in discussion with the New Zealand government regarding Telecom's monopoly control of the NZ broadband network. Three to four years previously, British Telecom were in a similar position to that which NZ Telecom are now in; the British broadband network has since been broken up and the NZ government are keen to learn and possibly copy the development/regulatory/investment model used by the British firm.
The Auckland Chamber of Commerce publicly stated that if Telecom did not invest in a next-generation high-speed network, comparable with that of other Western nations, they would fund a private fibre-optic based service in the 100 megabit speed range. The proposed coverage of this would be within 200m of a path running south from Auckland CBD (situated to allow as many businesses as possible to connect). Any company or private individual within this range would be offered a connection.
28 June: Telecom announced that Paul Reynolds, CEO of BT Wholesale, has been selected as the new CEO, to start on 27 September. Simon Moutter was appointed as acting CEO in the interim.
30 June: Theresa Gattung steps down as CEO, with a reported leaving payment of $5.125 million.
27 September: Dr Paul Reynolds starts as CEO of Telecom.
In November 2007, the Boost Mobile brand was discontinued in New Zealand by Telecom..
21 November: Mark Ratcliffe, Chief Operating Officer for Technology, is appointed CEO of Telecom's soon-to-be spun off network division.

2008

16 January: Telecom announces the formation of Chorus, its new network infrastructure division.
31 March: Telecom officially separates into three divisions (Chorus, Telecom Wholesale, Telecom Retail)
1 April: Russ Houlden, a colleague of Reynolds at BT, is appointed Chief Financial Officer. He replaces Marko Bogoievski, who joined Infratil.

2009
12 January: Telecom announces the closure of its online retail store Ferrit.
August: An industrial dispute emerged between Chorus and the Engineering, Printing and Manufacturing Union after servicing contracts in the Auckland and Northland regions are awarded to Australian company Visionstream, which planned to change technicians' employment contracts to a dependent contractor model.
In October a new logo was announced.

2010s

2010
November: Telecom moves into its newly built world HQ on Victoria St in the Auckland CBD. Costing the developer $280 million, it will consist of 2700 staff and be the largest corporate move in New Zealand history.

2011
24 May: Crown Fibre Holdings announced that Telecom had been successful in partnering with the Government to build a fibre network.
9 June: The National Business Review reveals that in OIA documents that the Department of Internal Affairs considered at least one text message sent by Telecom to be in breach of the Unsolicited Electronic Messages Act 2007.
1 December: Telecom divests itself of Chorus, the Network Infrastructure division, in a one for five share deal, with Chorus becoming a separately listed company.

2013
9 December: Telecom announces sale of AAPT for A$450 million

2014
21 February: Telecom announces a name change to 'Spark', which took effect on 8 August 2014 to better reflect the company's new direction and aspirations.
25 June 2014: Spark announce Lightbox, an online movie and TV show streaming service, in competition with Netflix and SkyTV. Lightbox went live on 27 August 2014.
8 August: Telecom rebrands as Spark. Individual subsidiaries of the company are rebranded to reflect the name change such as Telecom Mobile becomes Spark Mobile, Telecom Foundation becomes Spark Foundation, Gen-i is rebranded as Spark Digital. The company kept the existing Star shaped logo with each division using a different colour for the logo such as silver for Spark New Zealand, orange or pink for Spark Home & Mobile stores, green for Spark Business and purple for Spark Digital.
5–7 September: Spark experiences nationwide outages due to a denial of service attack, which was believed to have largely originated from malware that installed itself onto customers' computers when they clicked on malicious links to celebrity photos leaked in August.

2015
 12 August: Spark released a new cloud based consumer service called Morepork, which offers smart home based security services. This enabled consumers to purchase security hardware and services through a monthly subscription for home monitoring linked to their mobile phone.
 7 December: Spark purchased a South Island based IT services firm, Computer Concepts Ltd, for $50 million NZD.

2019
 14 March: Spark launched its subscription based sports streaming service Spark Sport. The service would compete against Sky Sport (New Zealand) which at the time had a near monopoly on pay TV sports rights in New Zealand.
 19 December: It was announced that Spark would be selling its Lightbox streaming service to the satellite television company Sky Television, which intends to merge Lightbox into its own online streaming service Neon in 2020. Following the merger, Spark will partner with Sky to make the service available to Spark customers through the telecommunication company's entertainment offers.

Mobile network
Telecom started the first cellular network services using AMPS in 1987. This transitioned to D-AMPS TDMA digital services in the early 1990s. The service in the 800 MHz band gave great geographic coverage and set the bar for service performance for many years.

In 1996 Telecom introduced an innovative and first-to-market wireless data cellular network known as CDPD (Cellular Digital Packet Data) that provided IP connections with mobility. Introduced to the market by the product manager, David Beale, they succeeded in the very first iOT-device connections in the region connecting, amongst other things, Coke's vending machines, NZ Post's couriers and parcel tracking, and telemetry data from the Americas Cup yacht races in Auckland to feed a realtime TV graphics service.

Telecom Mobile, the mobile division of Telecom, reached 500,000 mobile customers connected to its network in 1998, which doubled to one million customers by 2000. 

In 2005, a phreaker exposed a vulnerability with the mobile network, allowing public access to almost anyone's voicemail; in response to concerns over privacy and security, this network issue was resolved.

On 31 March 2007, the 025 D-AMPS ("TDMA") cellular network was closed down. Then on 8 June of that year, Telecom Mobile announced plans to build a hybrid W-CDMA/UMTS-CDMA 850 MHz network, based on the WCDMA HSPA technology, to eventually replace its current CDMA EV-DO network. On 29 May 2009, Telecom launched its new network, branded as "XT", to the public.

In December 2009 and February 2010, Telecom's new XT Mobile Network experienced high-profile failures for many customers in locations from Taupo south, due to a radio network controller failure in Christchurch. As a result of the loss of service Telecom offered a $5 million compensation package for its customers.

In April 2010, Telecom released its first Android handset on the XT Mobile Network, the LG GW620.

On 31 July 2012, the Telecom CDMA mobile network was closed down.

In September 2013, Telecom officially launched new Ultra Mobile branding and plans. These plans include a free 4G upgrade (4G was made available later in November 2013) with a 1GB of data per day from Telecom WiFi hotspots. In October 2013, Telecom sought clearance to acquire management rights for parts of the 700 MHz spectrum with the intention of aiding in the development of its 4G mobile network.

Industry regulation and company restructuring
In 2000, the New Zealand Government conducted a comprehensive review of the regulatory regime in the telecommunications industry. Subsequently, in 2001 the Telecommunications Act was passed, which among other things established the role of a Telecommunications Commissioner.

In a decision by the Government on 3 May 2006, Telecom was forced to unbundle the local loop, to provide "access to fast, competitively priced broadband internet". The decision significantly affected the company's market share, and allowed competitors (such as TelstraClear, Orcon and Ihug) to offer broadband and other communications services throughout New Zealand by installing their own equipment in exchanges. The announcement of this decision was rushed ahead of schedule, as the documents were leaked to Telecom who advised the government of the leak. It was widely reported that the government had intended to make the announcement during the 2006 Budget. Most of Telecom's competitors and many independent commentators such as InternetNZ and Paul Budde applauded the decision, with opposition to unbundling coming from the Business Roundtable, Federated Farmers, and Bruce Sheppard (representing Telecom shareholders). Legislation was introduced to enable the regulatory changes. Three other political parties (New Zealand First, the Green Party and United Future) supported the decision, which would give the government at least 66 votes if there were no votes against the party line. The main opposition National Party initially opposed the unbundling decision, but later voted in favour of it after a select committee hearing. This left the ACT Party alone in opposing the decision.

The company was then affected by a series of other government decisions. Firstly, in early-June 2006 the Commerce Commission ruled on the contentious issue of mobile telephone termination charges, announcing that calls between a landline and a mobile phone within a geographically defined boundary could be connected free of termination charges. This ruling allowed Vodafone New Zealand to establish a mobile phone product which could also provide free local calling. Then, the Commerce Commission granted two of Telecom's competitors, CallPlus and ihug, access to an unrestricted, Unbundled Bitstream Service, which would allow them to provide competitive broadband services.

On 27 June 2006, the company announced that it would voluntarily separate its business into two separate operating business units – Wholesale and Retail. The Government introduced the Telecommunications Amendment Bill in November 2006 to force Telecom to open its network to competitors. The bill officially split Telecom into three business units from 31 March 2008, with network access separated from the wholesale and retail units.

In January 2012 Telecom launched a new Mobile Network aimed at the youth market named Skinny Mobile

On 28 March 2013, Telecom announced that it would reduce staff levels by constraint on recruitment activity and redundancies. This followed from speculation by MP Clare Curran that up to 1500 jobs would be cut from the company.

Spark Broadband
Spark is New Zealand's largest internet service provider. It was formerly named Xtra. The next largest ISP in the New Zealand market is Vodafone NZ, a position it acquired when it purchased TelstraClear in 2012.

Spark offers asymmetric digital subscriber line (ADSL), very-high-bit-rate digital subscriber line (VDSL) and fibre to the premises (FTTP) fixed-line broadband.

Spark Mobile

Spark Ultra Mobile is New Zealand's second-largest mobile operator by market-share, behind Vodafone. Telecom's mobile network was branded as "XT", and operates at 850 MHz nationwide (with some 2100 MHz overlay in urban areas), and delivers 3G data connectivity wherever there is coverage.

Telecom originally operated a TDMA (AMPS, Digital D-AMPS/TDMA) mobile network; this was superseded by its CDMA network. The TDMA network was turned off on 31 March 2007, and most of its customers migrated to CDMA. The CDMA EV-DO network was marketed as T3G, a 2 MB third-generation mobile system. Telecom announced on 8 June 2007 the intention to build a W-CDMA/UMTS network, to be called XT Mobile Network, based on WCDMA HSPA technology, to replace its current CDMA EV-DO network. The network was launched on 29 May 2009. The CDMA network ran in parallel with XT until it was shut down on 31 July 2012.

The TDMA network used the 025 mobile prefix, using a mixture of six- and seven-digit subscriber numbers. With the switch to CDMA, Telecom migrated to the 027 prefix and standardised the subscriber numbers to seven digits, adding a 4 to the beginning of old six-digit numbers.

Customer numbers and market share

Spark competes with Vodafone, 2degrees and mobile virtual network operators for market share. In November 2015, Spark had 2,200,000 mobile customers at 40% market share.

The following shows customer numbers and market share information for Telecom Mobile, covering both the now-shut-down TDMA and CDMA networks and Spark's current 3G, 4G, and 5G networks.

Spark Sport

Spark Sport is a New Zealand sports streaming service, owned and operated by Spark. The service was launched on 14 March 2019 after Spark obtained the New Zealand broadcast rights to various World Rugby events including the 2019 Rugby World Cup a year earlier. During that time, Spark Sport obtained the rights to several other sports to build its catalog, until the streaming service was ready for launch, coverage was sublicienced to TVNZ to screen. Its first major live sport broadcast was the streaming of the 2019 Australian F1 Grand Prix.

There were concerns that Spark's broadcast of the Rugby World Cup would struggle under New Zealand's internet capabilities especially in rural communities and anticipated audience numbers streaming matches resulting in similar issues to Optus Sport's broadcasting FIFA World Cup 2018 in Australia. On the second day of the Rugby World Cup, Spark Sport suffered technical issues during its live stream of the match between New Zealand and South Africa leaving viewers unable to watch the game, as a result broadcast of the second half was simulcast of traditional television on TVNZ Duke as part of a contingency plan with free-to-air broadcaster TVNZ for issues during the Rugby World Cup. Viewers would continue to report issues throughout the tournament, despite the issues Spark responded noting that there were no issues from their end in the broadcast feed and that the issues experienced were due to the individual viewer's set up configuration of their streaming devices.

Following its broadcast of the 2019 Rugby World Cup, Spark Sport announced it had secured a six-year broadcast deal with New Zealand Cricket for all domestic and international cricket played within New Zealand. The rights had been previously held by Sky Sport for over 25 years. Spark Sport's coverage of cricket is presented by Scotty Stevenson, with regular analysts and commentators including Mark Richardson, Craig McMillan, Craig Cumming, Brendon McCullum, Grant Elliott, Stephen Fleming, Rebecca Rolls and Frances Mackay. American outside broadcast provider Gravity Media provided the equipment to cover Spark's coverage, brought over from Australia, while UK's Whisper TV provided the overall production element. During the 2022/23 season NEP Group was given the outside broadcast contract, which, ironically, bought outside broadcast company On Site Broadcasting (OSB) from Sky in 2020.

Spark Sport was the host broadcaster for the 2021 Rugby World Cup held in New Zealand.

Spark had previously broadcast sport through its subscription video on-demand service Lightbox partnering with Coliseum Sports Media to deliver a subscription-based sports streaming service called Lightbox Sport streaming golf, English Premier League football and French Top 14 rugby.

In December 2022, Spark Sport announced that it would be shutting down in the second half of 2023 due to a combination of financial and technical problems. The remaining three years broadcasting rights for all New Zealand Cricket international and domestic games within New Zealand would go to TVNZ from 1 July 2023. The Formula 1 had moved to Sky TV and Sky Sport.

Sports
 Rugby Union
 2019 Men's Rugby World Cup
 2021 Women's Rugby World Cup
 European Rugby Champions Cup

 Football
 2024 UEFA Euro
 2022 UEFA Women's Euro
 UEFA Nations League
 UEFA Champions League
 UEFA Europa League
 UEFA Europa Conference League
 UEFA Super Cup
 UEFA Women's Champions League
 2024 Copa America
 2022 Copa America Femenina
 Copa Libertadores
 Copa Sudamericana
 Recopa CONMEBOL
 CONMEBOL World Cup Qualifying
 Women's Super League
 FA Community Shield
 EFL Cup
 Women's FA Cup

 Cricket
 New Zealand Cricket
 Home internationals
 Men's Super Smash and Women's Super Smash
 The Ford Trophy final
 England and Wales Cricket Board
 Home internationals
 The Hundred
 Vitality Blast
 Royal London One-Day Cup final
 Highlights from ICC events.

 Motorsport
 Formula One + Junior Series (F2, F3)
 World Rally Championship + Other Series (WRC2, WRC3)
 MotoGP + Junior Series (Moto2, Moto3)
 DTM
 Porsche Supercup
 World Rallycross Championship
 EuroFormula Open Championship
 European Le Mans Series
 International GT Open
 Toyota Racing Series

 Rugby League
 2021 Men's Rugby League World Cup
 2021 Women's Rugby League World Cup
 2021 Wheelchair Rugby League World Cup
 2021 Physical Disability Rugby League World Cup

 Hockey
 Men's Pro League
 Women's Pro League

 Tennis
 WTA Tour events excluding events played in New Zealand.

 Other Sports
 Horse racing via TAB Trackside channels
 MLB
 NFL
 NBA via NBA TV
 UFC pay-per-view events

Criticism
When Telecom held a general monopoly in New Zealand telecommunications, it was criticised for using its incumbent status to charge high prices. Prices have subsequently dropped as competition in the market has increased.

Competitors alleged that Telecom engaged in unfair practices to prevent them from gaining ground, for example by reselling broadband capacity to Xtra at lower prices than to other ISPs. In July 2005, two dozen Internet service providers formally complained to New Zealand's Commerce Commission via a letter. Notably absent from the list of signatories were Telecom's ISP, Xtra, and several ISPs owned by its main competitor, TelstraClear. On 1 February 2007 the Consumers' Institute gave its "supreme ass award" for bad products to Telecom for its Xtra broadband service, Consumers Institute executive director David Russell claimed that since Telecom "unleashed" its broadband speeds, the institute had been "inundated with complaints of slower speeds and frustrating cutouts". Telecom has been given the Roger Award more than once, in 2004 and 2007 – and only the second company awarded as such, with the defunct TranzRail being the first.

The New Zealand Treasury once estimated the economic loss from Telecom's (now former) monopoly to be in the region of $50–$250 million a year. Another study commissioned in 1998 by competitor Clear (later TelstraClear) estimated that the loss was $400 million a year. At a retail level Telecom now faces competition in all areas — cellular, internet, toll-calls and, subject to ongoing developments, in local calling. At a network level these retail services often resell Telecom wholesale products.

Telecom claimed one reason for poor broadband uptake in New Zealand was because of the fact New Zealand residential subscribers enjoy free local calling. Telecom stated "customers have the option of moving to faster broadband services, but free local calling creates a disincentive by allowing them to use dial-up for as long they want" (i.e. they do not have to pay a per-minute call charge while using dial-up, unlike many other countries where local calls are charged for). However, some experts and competitors disagreed – including the secretary of the OECD.

Telecom failed to reach their self-imposed goal of around 83,333 wholesale broadband customers by the end of 2005. During her opening address to parliament, Prime Minister Helen Clark criticised the state of the internet in New Zealand. This was followed by extensive criticism in the media such as in two high-profile television programmes, in two episodes of Campbell Live (whose past major sponsors include Telecom), during which CEO Theresa Gattung was challenged by host John Campbell, and an episode of the New Zealand edition of Sunday. Critical articles had been published by various magazines and newspapers, including the largest newspaper, The New Zealand Herald. Of significance, many of these were lengthy and high-profile articles compared to many previous articles critical of Telecom — among the most noticeable of these was published by the National Business Review, in which it was stated that "Far from being 'Xtraordinary', as its multimillion dollar advertising would have you believe, Telecom is strangling the nation's advancement." While in Wellington for an ICANN meeting, Vint Cerf was reported to have made a personal visit to David Cunliffe, the telecommunications minister where it is believed he recommended that Telecom be unbundled. The government investigated whether it needed to force Telecom to unbundle the network, thereby allowing other companies access and improving broadband service for consumers.

From 2007, Yahoo! provided Telecom's email service, which came under heavy criticism in early 2013 following a spam and phishing attack described as the biggest to have ever hit the country. Telecom and Yahoo! automatically reset tens of thousands of users' passwords. In April, Telecom announced that despite the issue, it would keep Yahoo! on as an email provider. Problems with Telecom's YahooXtra email continued into December 2013 and further into 2014 with the latest problems reported on 10 January. They later moved their mail service to SMX, a New Zealand-based provider, in May 2017.

References

External links

 
 Spark Foundation

Companies based in Auckland
Telecommunications companies established in 1987
Companies listed on the New Zealand Exchange
Mobile phone companies of New Zealand
Privatisation in New Zealand
Telecommunications companies of New Zealand
Companies listed on the Australian Securities Exchange
New Zealand companies established in 1987
Consumer electronics retailers of New Zealand